Boletina gripha is a Palearctic species of  'fungus gnats' in the family Mycetophilidae. It is found in a wide variety of habitats from wooded streams to wetlands and open moorland.
Reared from brown rot of spruce stump, spruce log bearing loose bark and decaying wood of pine. Larvae have been on the surface of decaying wood (white rot) covered with Resinicium bicolor, from soil in pine forest and from fruiting bodies of Suillus bovinus.

References

External links
 Images representing Boletina gripha at BOLD

Mycetophilidae
Insects described in 1885
Nematoceran flies of Europe